Rolf Furuseth (born 27 September 1915 in Vestre Toten, died 16 May 1984) was a Norwegian politician for the Labour Party.

He was elected to the Norwegian Parliament from Oppland in 1969, and was re-elected on two occasions. He had previously served as a deputy representative during the terms 1958–1961 and 1965–1969.

On the local level he was a member of Vestre Toten municipality council from 1955 to 1971, the last three terms in the executive committee. He chaired the municipal party chapter from 1962 to 1963.

Outside politics he worked at Raufoss Ammunisjonsfabrikker. He became involved in the trade union there.

References

1915 births
1984 deaths
Place of death missing
Members of the Storting
Labour Party (Norway) politicians
Oppland politicians
Norwegian trade unionists
People from Vestre Toten
20th-century Norwegian politicians